Ion Tănăsescu may refer to:

Ion Tănăsescu (chemist) (1892–1959), Romanian chemist
Ion Tănăsescu (surgeon) (1875–1954), Romanian surgeon and anatomist